The Ladhowal rail disaster on 23 May 2003, was a flash fire which began at 4am on the Frontier Mail train service in India, and engulfed three carriages before it could be extinguished. 39 people lost their lives and another 15 were hospitalised with severe burns.

The train service from Mumbai to Amritsar, had just passed the station at Ludhiana Junction and was approaching Ladhowal, travelling at over 100km/h. 

Eyewitness A. D. Singh reported that he had seen the fire begin as a result of a dropped cigarette, whilst Safi Pitoliwali claims he saw electrical wiring in the toilet of the fourth carriage catch alight, but what ever the cause, the speed of the train combined with the open windows during the Indian summer to create an inferno, as air carried the fire back through three carriages in a massive burst of flame.

Most of the dead were killed in this initial burst, as doors were slammed shut by the gust, trapping the commuters inside, where they burnt to death. Those that could dived under seats or leaped from the speeding train, but over fifty people were killed or critically injured in the first few seconds of the fire. 34 of the dead were in carriage five, and five more in carriage four, whilst those in carriage three escaped with mild burns, although all three carriages were later gutted.

Four minutes after the fire had begun, the train had stopped, thanks to the emergency cord, which had alerted the driver. The train's crew detached the un burnt carriages and they with fellow passengers attempted to rescue the many injured people caught in the fire, or who had leaped from the train to escape the flames. When emergency services did arrive, there was no water available due to a local drought, so the wreckage had to be left to burn itself out.

Most of the dead were only identifiable by dental records.  Some remained unidentified and were being buried in a mass grave. The cleanup operation involved over 100 soldiers, as well as police and medical personnel from as far as New Delhi. 

It was the second major train accident in India of the new year, and provoked extensive criticism of the Transport Ministry, who were claiming vast improvements in safety standards on Indian railways, following a string of appalling accidents.

Officials later ruled out terrorism or sabotage, often the first suggestion in situations like this, instead reporting that a spark lit some spilled flammable liquid in the toilet of carriage number five, which was caught by the wind and ripped down the train.  A later report claimed the fire originated in a bag of 'combustible materials', but did not elaborate on how it caught fire.

External links
 Early News Report
 Indian authorities Post-Fire Report by (suspect authenticity)]
 Irish News Report

Train and rapid transit fires
Railway accidents and incidents in Punjab, India
Fires in India
Railway accidents in 2003
Transport in Ludhiana
2003 fires in Asia
2003 disasters in India
2000s in Punjab, India
Chimney effect fires
May 2003 events in India